Qolqol Rud District is a district (bakhsh) in Tuyserkan County, Hamadan Province, Iran. At the 2006 census, its population was 21,011, in 4,913 families.  The District has one city: Farasfaj. The District has three rural districts (dehestan): Kamal Rud Rural District, Miyan Rud Rural District, and Qolqol Rud Rural District.

Most of the villages are populated by Kurds.

References 

Tuyserkan County
Districts of Hamadan Province